Jack Bradford (born July 26, 1959) is an American / Australian stage actor and director. He is perhaps best known by many in Brisbane for founding the Brisbane Junior Theatre company which presented its first production – The Pirates of Penzance – in April 2001.

Bradford, the son of Gerald and Rose Bradford, was born in 1959 at Milton, Florida, US. His father was a Navy captain, which meant that Jack and his seven siblings were regularly on the move. His first stage role was taking the part of Jesus in Godspell working alongside Kathy Najimy in 1975. After completing his Bachelor of Arts degree in theatre, he moved to Brisbane, Australia, in 1988, having married an Australian, Deborah Onions, whom he had met on a visit to Australia in 1986. From 1989 to 1993, he was the senior pastor of the Christian Praise Centre in Glen Innes, N.S.W.
In 1993, Jack, Debbie and their three boys moved back to Brisbane, which is where they currently live.

Stage

Brisbane Junior Theatre productions

References

External links

Brisbane Junior Theatre
 http://www.fusion-journal.com/wp-content/uploads/sites/28/2019/03/Bradford_Brisbane-Junior-Theatre.pdf

1959 births
Living people
Central Wyoming College alumni
People from Milton, Florida
American male stage actors
20th-century American male actors
21st-century American male actors
Male actors from Florida
American emigrants to Australia